Simaika is a given name and surname. Notable people with the name include:

Farid Simaika (1907–1943), Egyptian diver 
Marcus Simaika (1864–1944), Egyptian Coptic leader and politician
Simaika Mikaele (born 1978), Samoan rugby union player